The Tibetan Annals, or Old Tibetan Annals (OTA), are composed of two manuscripts written in Old Tibetan language found in the early 20th century in the "hidden library", the Mogao Grottoes near Dunhuang in northwestern Gansu province, Western China, which is believed to have been sealed in the 11th century CE. They form Tibet's earliest extant history.

The two manuscripts are known as the "civil" and "military" versions of the Annals. The "civil" version covers the years 650–748 with some gaps. The "military" version is designated Or.8212/187 is also held at the British Library. This version is much shorter and covers the years 743–765 with some gaps.

Discovery
An enormous number of early manuscripts in a variety of languages were collected by A. Stein and P. Pelliot at the famous sealed-up Library Cave (no. 17) of the Mogao Grottoes and sent back to London and Paris respectively. Among these Dunhuang manuscripts, The Tibetan Annals (or "Tibet’s First History") were found along with the "Old Tibetan Chronicle", which was probably compiled between 800 and 840 CE.

Contents

The Annals begin with a very brief account of the early events of the reign of Songtsen Gampo, the first Tibetan Emperor. From the time the Chinese Princess Wencheng arrived in 643 CE until Songtsen Gampo's death in 650 it is possible to accurately date the entries. It then gives a dated, year-by-year précis of important events from 650 to 764 CE. For example, in 763 CE, Tibetan soldiers captured the Chinese capital of Chang'an for fifteen days when the ruling Tang dynasty was recovering from the An Lushan Rebellion. Of course, annals continued to be recorded after this date but, unfortunately, only one or two other minor fragments have survived. The Tibetan cyclic system dates are in much-faded red ink.

These accounts, generally accepted as sober court records, provide a priceless view of Tibet in its early phase of expansion and establishment as a powerful empire. They also provide a valuable way of checking and dating events mentioned in later Tibetan and Chinese historical records.

Neither the Annals nor the Chronicle make any mention of Buddhism in the reign of Songtsen Gampo.

Footnotes

References
 Bacot, Thomas and Toussaint (1940–1946). Documents de Touen-houang relatifs a l'histoire de Tibet. J. Bacot, F. W. Thomas, Ch. Touissant. Paris. Libraire orientaliste Paul Geunther.
 
 Choephel, Gedun (1978). The White Annals. Library of Tibetan Works & Archives Dharamsala, H.P., India.
 Dotson, Brandon (2009). The Old Tibetan Annals: An Annotated Translation of Tibet's First History. VÖAW, Austria.  (book);  (online edition).

External links

Free access to the original Tibetan texts online
"Preface to the Asianart.com edition of this article." By Amy Heller, Jan 21, 2007.

Tibet
History of Tibet
Tibetan literature
11th-century books
Dunhuang manuscripts